The 1994 United States Senate election in Connecticut was held November 8, 1994. Incumbent Democratic U.S. Senator Joe Lieberman won re-election to a second term.

Republican primary

Candidates 
 Jerry Labriola, State Senator and professor at the University of Connecticut
 Joe Bentivegna

Results

General election

Candidates 
 Joe Lieberman (D), incumbent U.S. Senator
 Jerry Labriola (R), State Senator and professor at the University of Connecticut

Results

See also 
 1994 United States Senate elections

References 

Connecticut
1994
United States Senate
Joe Lieberman